Ramganj Belgachhi   is a village development committee in Sunsari District in the Kosi Zone of south-eastern Nepal. At the time of the 1991 Nepal census it had a population of 5502 people living in 1005 individual households.

References

Ramganj Belgachhiya Village Development Committee (VDC) is going to be declared as an ODF (Open Defecation Free) VDC on Monday 10:30 a.m. 14 July 2014. The V-WASH-CC (Village Water, Sanitation and Hygiene Committee) is going to organize this program at the field of Shree Nawadurga High School.

Populated places in Sunsari District